Reginald Smith, Jr. (born September 3, 1986) is a former American football safety. He was drafted by the San Francisco 49ers in the third round of the 2008 NFL Draft. He played college football at Oklahoma.

College career
Smith was named the preseason Big 12 Defensive Player of the Year for the 2007 season. He finished the year ranked fourth on the team with 78 tackles and also added three interceptions.

Professional career

San Francisco 49ers
Smith was drafted by the San Francisco 49ers in the third round (75th overall) of the 2008 NFL Draft. He appeared in three games as a rookie, recording three tackles.

In the 2009 offseason, it was reported that Smith would convert from cornerback to safety.
In July 2009, he changed his number to 30, and gave 31 to teammate Dre Bly. He had his first career interception for a touchdown against the Indianapolis Colts.

Smith started the 2010 season as the backup to Dashon Goldson and Michael Lewis. But after Lewis requested his release prior to the week 4 game in Atlanta, Taylor Mays was named starter and held that role for the next 7 weeks. Reggie was named starter in week 11 vs the Tampa Bay Buccaneers.

Carolina Panthers
Smith signed with the Carolina Panthers on April 4, 2012.
He was released on August 31, 2012 in the last roster cuts for the Panthers.

Oakland Raiders
Smith signed with the Oakland Raiders on April 10, 2013. He was released August 31, 2013.

References

External links

Oakland Raiders bio
Carolina Panthers bio
San Francisco 49ers bio
Oklahoma Sooners bio

1986 births
Living people
Sportspeople from Edmond, Oklahoma
American football cornerbacks
American football safeties
Oklahoma Sooners football players
San Francisco 49ers players
Carolina Panthers players
Oakland Raiders players
Players of American football from Oklahoma